Alwand Dam Lake is an Iraqi lake located in Khanaqin City in Diyala in eastern Iraq. The lake was formed after the construction of the Alwand Dam and the surrounding lands, which lie southeast of Diyala up to the international border with the Republic of Iran.

Size 
Alwand Lake is the third largest lake in Diyala dedicated to providing drinking water and irrigating crops in Khanaqin district and its outskirts.

References 

Lakes of Iraq
Khanaqin